Amanses scopas, also known as the broom filefish, is a filefish, the only species in the genus Amanses of the family Monacanthidae. It is also called brush-sided leatherjacket in Australia or broom leatherjacket in Christmas Island.

The broom filefish is a harmless tropical reef fish from the Red Sea and the Indo-Pacific oceans, growing to a length of 20 cm. The body is brown with up to 12 narrow dark brown crossbars, the caudal fin is dark brown, and the soft dorsal, anal and pectoral fins are pale. Males have numerous long spines in front of the caudal peduncle, and females similarly have a toothbrush-like mass of setae in the same location.

They occur in areas of mixed sand, rubble, and coral heads of semi-protected seaward reefs.

References

External links
 

Monacanthidae

Fish described in 1829
Taxa named by Georges Cuvier